This is a list of airports in Thailand. Six major international airports are managed by Airports of Thailand PCL (AOT). Smaller commercial airports may be operated by the Department of Airports or individual airlines.



Airports

International airports

Airports with scheduled commercial service

Other airports 
This includes commercial airports without scheduled services, military airports, and airports and airstrips used solely for general aviation.

See also 
 List of the busiest airports in Thailand
 Transport in Thailand
 List of airports by ICAO code: V#VT - Thailand
 Wikipedia:WikiProject Aviation/Airline destination lists: Asia#Thailand

Notes

References 

 
  - includes IATA codes
 Airports of Thailand Public Company Ltd.
 Thailand VFR Guide
 Thai Flying Club
 Chiang Mai Flying Club
 Nok Flying Club
 Nok Gliding Club
 Airports and Airfields at GlobalSecurity.org

External links 

 Lists of airports in Thailand:
 Great Circle Mapper
 FallingRain.com
 Aircraft Charter World
 The Airport Guide
 World Aero Data
 A-Z World Airports Online

Thailand
 
Airports
Airports
Thailand